The Cleveland Indians finished the 1976 MLB season with an 81–78 win–loss record. The team scored 615 runs and allowed 615 runs for a run differential of zero.

Offseason 
 November 22, 1975: Oscar Gamble was traded by the Indians to the New York Yankees for Pat Dobson.
 December 9, 1975: John Ellis was traded by the Indians to the Texas Rangers for Stan Thomas and Ron Pruitt.
 December 9, 1975: Ray Fosse was purchased by the Indians from the Oakland Athletics.
 December 12, 1975: Jack Brohamer was traded by the Indians to the Chicago White Sox for Larvell Blanks.

Regular season

Season standings

Record vs. opponents

Notable transactions 
 May 28, 1976: Fritz Peterson was traded by the Indians to the Texas Rangers for Stan Perzanowski and cash.
 June 8, 1976: 1976 Major League Baseball draft
Joe Beckwith was drafted by the Indians in the 12th round, but did not sign.
Ron Hassey was drafted by the Indians in the 18th round.
 October 1, 1976: Ramón Romero was signed as an amateur free agent by the Indians.

Opening Day Lineup

Roster

Player stats
Note: G = Games played; AB = At bats; R = Runs scored; H = Hits; 2B = Doubles; 3B = Triples; HR = Home runs; RBI = Runs batted in; AVG = Batting average; SB = Stolen bases

Batting

Pitching
Note: W = Wins; L = Losses; ERA = Earned run average; G = Games pitched; GS = Games started; SV = Saves; IP = Innings pitched; R = Runs allowed; ER = Earned runs allowed; BB = Walks allowed; K = Strikeouts

Awards and honors 

All-Star Game

Farm system

Notes

References 
1976 Cleveland Indians team page at Baseball Reference
1976 Cleveland Indians team page at www.baseball-almanac.com

Cleveland Guardians seasons
Cleveland Indians season
Cincinnati Indians